The UK Albums Chart is one of many music charts compiled by the Official Charts Company that calculates the best-selling albums of the week in the United Kingdom. Before 2004, the chart was only based on the sales of physical albums. This list shows albums that peaked in the top 10 of the UK Albums Chart during 1960, as well as albums which peaked in 1959 or 1961 but were in the top 10 in 1960. The entry date is when the album appeared in the top 10 for the first time (week ending, as published by the Official Charts Company, which is six days after the chart is announced).

Top-ten albums
Key

See also
1960 in British music
List of number-one albums from the 1960s (UK)

References
General

Specific

External links
1960 album chart archive at the Official Charts Company (click on relevant week)

United Kingdom top 10 albums
Top 10 albums